Favorinus tsuruganus is a species of aeolid nudibranch, a sea slug. It is a marine gastropod mollusk in the family Facelinidae.

Description
Favorinus tsuruganus grows to a maximum length of 25 mm. The back and oral tentacles are opaque white and there is a yellow patch on the front of the head. The rhinophores are black, and swell in a collar-like shape in three places. The cerata have black tips with the digestive gland duct being orange, a distinguishing feature of this species.

Distribution
This species occurs in Japan, more rarely in eastern Australia down to around Sydney, and has a wide western Pacific distribution.

Diet and behaviour
Favorinus tsuruganus feeds on the eggs of a wide range of other opisthobranchs, in particular, Hexabranchus.

References

External links
 Images
 

Facelinidae
Gastropods described in 1964